Anthony William Robinson  (born 25 April 1956) is a British Anglican bishop. Since 2015, he has been the area Bishop of Wakefield in the Diocese of Leeds. From 2002 to 2015, he served as Bishop of Pontefract in the Diocese of Wakefield.

Early life and education
Robinson was educated at Bedford Modern School. He trained for the priesthood at Salisbury and Wells Theological College.

Ordained ministry
Robinson was made a deacon at Petertide 1982 (27 June) by Brian Masters, Bishop of Fulham, at Christ Church, Southgate, and ordained a priest in 1983. His ministry began with a curacy at St Paul's, Tottenham. He was then Rural Dean of North Leicester. He served as the Archdeacon of Pontefract from 1997 to 2002.

Episcopal ministry
Robinson was consecrated to the episcopate on 6 December 2002, by David Hope, Archbishop of York, at York Minster. From 2002 until 2014, Robinson was suffragan Bishop of Pontefract in the Diocese of Wakefield.

In 2014, the Diocese of Leeds was created. Upon the dissolution of the Wakefield diocese and the erection of the Leeds diocese, Robinson became area bishop for the Wakefield area. His title remained Bishop of Pontefract until that see was translated to Wakefield (i.e. the title changed to Bishop of Wakefield) by Order in Council of 19 March 2015. He also provides alternative episcopal oversight under the House of Bishops' Declaration on the Ministry of Bishops and Priests throughout the whole of the Diocese of Leeds.

Robinson is the patron of Street Angels – Christian Nightlife Initiatives, a post held since 2010.

Views
As of late March 2014 he is the only bishop in the Church of England to have voted in his diocesan synod against new legislation which could enable women to become bishops. In 2014, he became chairman of Forward in Faith, an Anglican movement that promotes "catholic order and the catholic doctrine of the Sacraments, and in particular the threefold ministry in historic succession, which the Church of England". He is Chairman of the Council of Bishops of The Society.

Personal life
Robinson has been married since 1981 and has three children.

Styles
The Reverend Tony Robinson (1983–1994)
The Reverend Canon Tony Robinson (1994–1997)
The Venerable Tony Robinson (1997–2002)
The Right Reverend Tony Robinson (2002–present)

References

1956 births
People educated at Bedford Modern School
21st-century Anglican Church of Canada bishops
Living people
Bishops of Pontefract
Bishops of Wakefield
Archdeacons of Pontefract
Anglican Diocese of Leeds
Anglo-Catholic bishops
English Anglo-Catholics